This is a list of the songs that have reached number one on the Mahasz Rádiós Top 40 airplay chart during the 2010s. The issue date is the date the song began its run at number one.

References
 Hungarian Airplay Chart - archives from 2002 to present

Hungary
Number-one singles
2010s